Charles Russell (March 31, 1918 – January 18, 1985) was a movie and radio actor who appeared in 17 movies between 1943 and 1950. 

Born in New York City, Russell made his debut in an uncredited part as a ball player in Ladies' Day (1943). His last film was Chinatown at Midnight (1949).  He originated the role of insurance investigator Johnny Dollar in the CBS Radio series  Yours Truly, Johnny Dollar in 1949, playing the role until being replaced by Edmond O'Brien in 1950.

Russell married fellow 20th Century-Fox contract player Nancy Guild in 1947, and they had one child, a daughter, Elizabeth, in 1949. They divorced in 1950.

Russell died in Beverly Hills, California.

Filmography

References

External links

1918 births
1985 deaths
American male radio actors
American male film actors
Male actors from New York City
20th-century American male actors